= Instant Replay (video game) =

1987 sports video game

- Publisher(s): Software Innovations
- Release: 1987
- Genre(s): Sports

Instant Replay is a football video game published in 1987 by Software Innovations.

== Gameplay ==
Instant Replay is a game in which the player can replay full NFL seasons using the entire statistics base from 1986.

== Reception ==
Wyatt Lee reviewed the game for Computer Gaming World, and stated that "not exactly a game, but it is worthy of note for those who like to replay full seasons of NFL games using the computer vs. computer mode."
